The following is an alphabetical list of characters (and their performers) from the NBC soap opera Days of Our Lives, sorted by character surname.

A
Annabelle
Alisa Alapach (2016)

Artemis
Kwesi Boakye (2007)

Umar Abboud
Rick Fitts (2007)

Hattie Adams
Given plastic surgery by Wilhelm Rolf to look like Marlena Evans under orders from Stefano. Briefly married to John Black while impersonating Marlena.
Andrea Hall (2000–01)
Deidre Hall (2004, 2016–20)

Lawrence Alamain (deceased)
Son of Leopold and Philomena Alamain, heir to Alamain Industries and owner of JenCon Oil; father of Nicholas Alamain, nephew of Vivian Alamain, adopted brother of John Black; had marriages to Jennifer Horton, and Carly Manning. Stabbed to death by Carly in 2009. 
Michael Sabatino (1990–93, 2009–11)
Evan Miller (1990, flashbacks)
Jeremy Kutner (1991, flashbacks)

Leopold Alamain (deceased)
Patriarch of the Alamain family, father of Lawrence Alamain and brother of Vivian Alamain; adopted father of John Black. Died from a heart attack. 
Avery Schreiber (1990)

Nicholas Alamain
Son of Lawrence Alamain and Carly Manning, half-brother of Melanie Jonas. 
Erik von Detten (1992–93)
Victor Webster (1999–2000)
Cody Longo (2011)

Vivian Alamain
Sister of Leopold Alamain, aunt of Lawrence Alamain, adopted aunt of John Black; mother of Quinn Hudson, Stefan DiMera and Jake DiMera; had marriages to Victor Kiriakis, Stefan Jones and Stefano DiMera. 
Louise Sorel (1992–2000, 2009–11, 2017–18, 2020)
Marj Dusay (1992–93; temporary replacement)
Robin Strasser (2019)
Linda Dano (2021)

Margo Anderman Horton (deceased)
Wife of Mike Horton. Died from leukemia in 1980, and appeared as a ghost in 1986. 
Susanne Zenor (1977–80, 1986)

Bob Anderson (deceased)
Owner of Anderson Manufacturing. Father of Mary Anderson and Robert Anderson Jr. (stillborn son with Julie), father of Brooke Hamilton; had marriages to Phyllis Anderson, Julie Olson and Linda Patterson. Died of a heart attack in 1980. 
Mark Tapscott (1972–78, 1978–80)
Dick Gitting (1978)

Linda Anderson (née Patterson)
Originally Mickey Horton's secretary, the relationship eventually became romantic. Biological mother of Melissa Horton (daughter with Jim); had marriages to Jim Philips and Bob Anderson; became CEO of Anderson Manufacturing, left Salem for good in 1985. 
Nadyne Turney (1970)
Margaret Mason (1970–71, 1975–80, 1982)
Elaine Princi (1984–85)

Mary Anderson (deceased)
Daughter of Bob Anderson and Phyllis Anderson; half-sister of Brooke Hamilton; married Alex Marshall. Murdered by the Salem Strangler.
Brigid Bazlen (1972)
Karin Wolfe (1972–75)
Nancy Stephens (1975)
Carla Borelli (1975)
Barbara Stranger (1976–80)
Susan Keller (1980)
Melinda Fee (1981–82)

Phyllis Anderson
Wife of Bob Anderson until 1974, mother of Mary Anderson. Part-owner of Anderson Manufacturing; married Neil Curtis in 1976.
Nancy Wickwire (1972–73)
Corinne Conley (1973–77, 1980, 1982)
Elizabeth MacRae (1977)

Albert Andrews
Roger Lodge (1988)

Bishop Andrews
Richard McGonagle (1994–95)

Kristina Andropolous
Chelsea Noble (1988)

Cassandra "China Lee" Arvin
Gillian Iliana Waters (2007)

Larry Atwood
Fred Beir (1977–78)

Cynthia Austin
Veronica Lauren (2001–02, 2007)

B
Blanca
Ximena Duque (2016)

Brenda
Holly Kaplan (2000–03)

Brian
Noshir Dalal (2009)

Karen Bader
Tammy Tavares (1995–96, 1998–2003, 2005–06)

Johnnie-Jean "J.J." Bagwood (deceased)
Patti Johns (1989–90)

Edith Baker
Darlene Conley (1983)

Francis Baker
Eric Christmas (1995–96)

Richard Baker
John Callahan (2008–10)

Salvatore "Sal" Bandino
Michael Quill (2003)
Robert Costanzo (2006)

Sister Mary Moira Banks
Eileen Davidson (1997–98, 2017)
Stacy Haiduk (2022)
Nun. Sister of Susan Banks.

Susan Banks
Eileen Davidson (1996–98, 2014, 2017, 2021)
Brynn Thayer (2011)
Stacy Haiduk (2018–19, 2021–)

David Banning (born David Martin, Jr.; deceased)
Chad Eric Barstad (1967–70)
Jeffrey William (1970–73)
Steve Doubet (1975)
Richard Guthrie (1975–81)
Gregg Marx (1981–83)
Son of Julie and David Martin, adopted by Scott and Janet Banning. Had marriages to Trish Clayton and Renee DuMonde. Father of Scotty Banning with Trish Clayton, and Eli Grant with Valerie Grant. Left town in 1983, killed in a motorcycle accident in February 2017.

Janet Banning
Joyce Easton (1968–69)

Scott Banning (deceased)
Robert Caraway (1968)
Mike Farrell (1968–70)
Robert Hogan (1970–71)
Ryan MacDonald (1971–73)

Scott "Scotty" Banning II
Erick Petersen (1978–80)
Dick Billingsley (1981–83)
Rick Hearst (1989–90)

Roberto Barelli
Francesco Romano (1998–2001)

Janice Barnes
Martha Nix (1976–78)
Elizabeth Storm (1987–88)

Joanna Barnes
Corinne Michael (1978–80)

Jordan Barr
George McDaniel (1979–80)

Billy Barton
Stephen Manley (1977–78)

Bart Beiderbecke (deceased)
Steve Blackwood (1997–2005, 2007)

Miles Berman
Kale Browne (2006–08)

Janet Bernard
Alla Korot (2016)

Belle Black
Brianna and Chalice Fischette (1993–95)
Brianna McConnell and Brittany McConnell (1995–98)
Ashlyn Messick and Kaylyn Messick (1998)
Chelsea Butler (1998–99)
Kirsten Storms (1999–2004)
Charity Rahmer (2004)
Martha Madison (2004–08, 2015–)

Brady Black
Alex, Dash and Max Lucero (1992–94)
Brandon and Eric Billings (1994–99)
Kyle Lowder (2000–05)
Piers Cox (flashbacks; 2001)
Eric Martsolf (2008–)

John Black
Glen Vincent (1985)
Robert Poynton (1985–86)
Drake Hogestyn (1986–2009, 2011–)

Tate Black
Peter and Thomas Machala (2015–16)
Matthew and Nathan Goss (2016)
Jacob and Wyatt Walker (2016–18)
Colin and Kyle Schroeder (2018)

Peter Blake
Jason Brooks (1993–98)

Rachel Blake
Pat Delany (1995–96)
Ann Hamilton (flashbacks: 1995–96)

Emmy Borden
Susan Diol (1990–91)

Cash Bowman
John Marlo (1993)

Calliope Jones Bradford
Arleen Sorkin (1984–90, 1992, 2001, 2006, 2010)

Eugene Bradford
John de Lancie (1982–86, 1989–90)

Bo Brady
Peter Reckell (1983–87, 1990–92, 1995–2012, 2015–16, 2022–)
Robert Kelker-Kelly (1992–95)

Caroline Brady (deceased)
Peggy McCay (1983, 1985–2016)
Jody Carter (1983–84)
Barbara Beckley (1984–85)
Holgie Forrester (2019)

Carrie Brady
Andrea Barber (1982–86)
Christie Clark (1986–99, 2005–06, 2010–12, 2017–19)
Tracy Middendorf (1992)

Cassie Brady
Alexis Thorpe (2002–05)

Chelsea Brady (born Georgia Brady)
Mandy Musgrave (2004–05)
Rachel Melvin (2005–09)

Ciara Brady
Dakota and Danica Hobbs (2007–08)
Lauren Boles (2008–15)
Vivian Jovanni (2015–17)
Victoria Konefal (2017–)

Claire Brady
Ava and Olivia White (2006–07)
Alina Foley (2008)
Olivia Rose Keegan (2015–20)
Isabel Durant (2020–21)

Colleen Brady (deceased)
Alison Sweeney (2007–08; flashbacks)
Shirley Jones (2008)

Eric Brady (I) (deceased)
Robert Hanley (1982)
Scott Marlowe (1984)

Eric Brady
Rory Beauregard (1984)
Jesse Davis (1985–86)
Edward Palma (1986)
Bradley Hallock (1986–92)
Jensen Ackles (1997–2000)
Greg Vaughan (2012–)

Frankie Brady (born François Von Leuschner)
Billy Warlock (1986–88, 1990–91, 2005–06)
Christopher Saavedra (1990; flashbacks)

Grace Brady (deceased)

Hope Williams Brady
Kristina Osterhout (1974)
Kimberly Weber (1974–75)
Natasha Ryan (1975–80)
Tammy Taylor (1981–82)
Kristian Alfonso (1983–87, 1990, 1994–2020, 2023–)
Mila Kunis (1994, flashback)

Kayla Brady Johnson
Catherine Mary Stewart (1982–83)
Mary Beth Evans (1986–92, 2006–)
Rhonda Aldrich (1989)

Kimberly Brady
Patsy Pease (1984–92, 1994, 1996–98, 2002–04, 2008, 2010, 2013–16)
Anne Howard (1990–91)
Casey Wallace (1992; flashbacks)
Ariana Chase (1992–93)

Max Brady
Michael Rhoton (1986–87)
Adrian Arnold (1987)
Ryan Brennan (1987–88, 1990–92)
Darin Brooks (2005–10)

Rex Brady
Eric Winter (2002–05)
Kyle Lowder (2018–21)

Roman Brady
Wayne Northrop (1981–84, 1991–94)
Josh Taylor (1997–)

Sami Brady
Ronit Aranoff (1984)
Lauren Ann Bundy (1984–85)
Jessica Davis (1985–86)
Tiffany Nicole Palma (1986)
Ashleigh Blair Sterling (1986–90)
Christina Wagoner (1990–92)
Alison Sweeney (1993–2015, 2017–)
Dan Wells (2005, 2021; when Sami was Stan)

Shawn Brady (deceased)
Frank Parker (1983–2008)
Lew Brown (1984–85)
Frank MacLean (1989–90)
Tanner Maguire (2007; flashbacks)

Shawn-Douglas Brady
Noel Bennett Castle (1987)
Paul Zachary (1990)
Scott Groff (1990–95)
Collin O'Donnell (1995–99)
Jason Cook (1999–2006, 2015)
Dyllan Christopher (2000, flashback)
Brandon Beemer (2006–08, 2016–)

Zack Brady (deceased)
Jacob and Joshua Rips (2000)
Alyssa and Lauren Libby (2000–01)
Max and Sam Christy (2001)
Garrett and Spencer Fraye (2001–06, 2008–09)
Scott Shilstone (2016; in a dream)

Alan Brand
Brian Lane Green (1987–88)

Cathy Breton
Cindy Daly (1979–80)

Molly Brinker
Shannon Sturges (1991–92)

Mary Brooke
Nancy Parsons (1996)

Zoey Burge
Unknown actress (1987)
Kelly Thiebaud (2020)
Alyshia Ochse (2020)

Joe Burke
Howard Witt (1980)

Lynn Burke
Marie-Alise Recasner (1994–98)

Cassie Burns
Deborah Dalton (1980)

C
Caprice
Fuschia! (2002–03)

Carol
Angel Parker (2012)

Cheryl
Tara Platt (2006)
Chille
Dot-Marie Jones (credited as Dot Marie Jones) (2016)

Chuck
Paul Strickland (1990–99)

Claude
Jordi Caballero (2008)

Clint
Lucas Kerr (2015)

Jamie Caldwell
Miriam Parrish (1993–96)

Rosie Carlson
Fran Ryan (1976–79)

Byron Carmichael
Bill Hayes (1979)

Gail Carson
Patrice Chanel (1989)

Abe Carver
James Reynolds (1981–)

Jett Carver
Marcus Patrick (2007)

Jonah Carver
Bumper Robinson (1987–89)
Thyme Lewis (1993–96)

Lexie Carver (Deceased)
Cyndi James Gossette (1987–89)
Angelique Francis (1989–90, 1992)
Shellye Broughton (1993)
Renée Jones (1993–2012)

Rita Carver (Deceased)
Lynn Hamilton (1987)

Theo Carver I (deceased)
Rusty Cundieff (1985)

Theo Carver II
Chase and Tyler Johnson (2003–04)
Kavi Faquir (2006–07)
Amyrh Harris (2007)
Terrell Ransom, Jr (2008–15)
Kyler Pettis (2015–18)
Cameron Johnson (2020–)

Kevin Cates
Eric Schiff (1984)

Richard Cates
Rod Arrants (1985)

Lauren Chaffee
Lisa Jay (2006–07)

Kellam Chandler
Bill Joyce  (1980–81)

Liz Chandler
Gloria Loring (1980–86)

Sunny Chandler
Sandy Elliott (1980)
Jody Gibson (1984)

Todd Chandler
Brett Williams (1980)
Paul Keenan (1980–81)
David Wallace (1985–86)

Alessandro Chavez
Ismael 'East' Carlo (2007)

Haley Chen
Thia Megia (2018–20)

Signore Christofero
Tyler Christopher (2001)

Jack Clayton
Jack Denbo (1974–77)

Jeri Clayton
Kaye Stevens (1974–79)

Trish Clayton
Patty Weaver (1974–82)

TR Coates
William Christian (2022–)

Phillip Collier
Doug Larson (1992)
Richard Burgi (1992–93)

Diana Colville
Genie Francis (1987–89)
Judith Chapman (2019)

Phillip Colville
Morgan Woodward (1987–88)

Serena Colville
Valerie Karasek (1987–88)

Sheryl Connors
Jade Harlow (2014)

Amy Cooper
Elizabeth Keifer (1985)

Giovanni "Johnny" Corelli
Antony Alda (1990–91)

Nick Corelli (deceased)
George Jensky (1981; 1984; 1986–90)

DJ Craig (deceased) 
Matthew Paul Bischof (1980)
Infant son of Don Craig and Marlena Evans, died of sudden infant death syndrome

Don Craig
Jed Allan (1971–85)

Donna Temple Craig
Tracey E. Bregman (1978–80)

Lorraine Farr Temple Craig
Francine York (1978)

Edmund Crumb
Adam Caine (1998)

Violet Crumb
Vicky Stuart (1998)

Neil Curtis (deceased)
Ben Archibek (1973–74)
Joseph Gallison (1974–91)

Noelle Curtis
Christina Maisano (1983)
Samantha Barrows (1983–88)

D
Daphne
Alisha Boe (2014–15)

Dave
Don Frabotta (1974–93, 2000–04)

Demarquette
Jalen Stokes (2007)

DiCarlo
Jamieson Price (2008)
Professor.

Dimitri
Michael O'Connor (1991–92)

Duck
Franc Ross (2007)

Charlie Dale (deceased)
Mike Manning (2020–22)

Tripp Dalton
Lucas Adams (2017–22)

Gwen Davies
Anne-Marie Martin (1982–85)

Cameron Davis
Schuyler Yancey (2010–12)
Nathan Owens (2012–13)

Ginger Dawson
Roberta Leighton (1991–92)

Crawford Decker
John Sanderford (2007–08)

Ford Decker (deceased)
Matthew Florida (2007)

Abigail Deveraux
Meghan and Michael Nelson (1992–94)
Paige and Ryanne Kettner (1994–98, 2000–01)
Megan Corletto (2001–03)
Jillian Clare (2003–04)
Ashley Benson (2004–07)
Emily Montague (2007)
Kate Mansi (2011–16, 2018–20)
Marci Miller (2016–18, 2020–22)
 
Anjelica Deveraux (deceased)
Jane Elliot (1987–89)
Shelley Taylor Morgan (1989)
Judith Chapman (1989–91, 2018)
Morgan Fairchild (2017)

Harper Deveraux (deceased)
Joseph Campanella (1987–88, 1990–92)

Jack Deveraux 
Joseph Adams (1987)
James Acheson (1987)
Matthew Ashford (1987–93, 2001–07, 2011–12, 2016–)
Mark Valley (1994–97)
Steve Wilder (1997–98)
Jon Lindstrom (2020)

JJ Deveraux
Tyler Lake (2004)
Jack and Nick Ravo (2005)
Jacob and Micah Reeves (2005–06)
Casey Moss (2013–20)

Anna DiMera
Leann Hunley (1982–86, 2007–10, 2017–)

André DiMera (deceased)
Thaao Penghlis (1983–84, 1993–95, 2002–05, 2007, 2015–19, 2022)
Wayne Northrop (1983, mask)

Chad DiMera
Casey Deidrick (2009–13)
Billy Flynn (2014–)

Charlotte DiMera

Daphne DiMera (deceased)
Madlyn Rhue (1982–84)

EJ DiMera (born Elvis Aron Banks)
Avalon, Dillon and Vincent Ragone (1997–98)
James Scott (2006–14)
Trey Baxter (2018)
Dan Feuerriegel (2021–)

Johnny DiMera
Ethan and Morgan (2007)
Mark Hapka (2007–08, dream sequences)
Ranger and Wiley Murphee (2008)
Gabriel and Gideon Lala (2008)
Jacob and Jonathan Velarde (2008)
Aaron and Griffin Kunitz (2009–14)
Carson Boatman (2021–)
Dan Feuerriegel (2022)
Brandon Barash (2022)

Kristen DiMera
Eileen Davidson (1993–98, 2012–15, 2017, 2021)
Leslie Lunceford (1996, flashbacks)
Stacy Haiduk (2018–)
Arianne Zucker (2019)
Linsey Godfrey (2021)
Lauren Koslow (2021)

Santo DiMera (deceased)
James Scott (2007–08)
Fabrizio Brienza (2012)
The father of Stefano DiMera, who had a relationship with Colleen Brady, depicted through flashbacks.

Stefan O. DiMera (born Sam Maitland, deceased) 
Tyler Christopher (2017–19)
Brandon Barash (2019–20, 2022–)
The illegitimate son of Stefano DiMera and Vivian Alamain

Stefano DiMera (deceased)
Joseph Mascolo (1982–85, 1988, 1993–2001, 2006–16)
Frank Fata (1991)
Davide Schiavone (2007; flashback)
Stephen Nichols (2019–20)
The seventh son of Santo DiMera, often referred to as the Phoenix, due to his habit of seemingly coming back from the dead on a regular basis. He was an infamous crime lord, with substantive ties to organized crime at home and abroad and known for his long-running feud with the Brady family. Father of André DiMera, Benjy Hawk, EJ DiMera, Chad DiMera, Renée DuMonde, Megan Hathaway, and Lexie Carver. Legal father of Tony DiMera. Adopted father of Kristen and Peter Blake. Had marriages to his common law wife Daphne DiMera, Vivian Alamain and Kate Roberts.

Sydney DiMera
Avery and Cade Sager (2009)
Hailey and Lauren Sinnema (2009–10)
Elizabeth and Mariam Tovey (2010–11)
Isabelle and Sahara Roberts (2011–12)
Nadia and Talia Hartounian (2013–14)
Berlyn and Brooklyn Baca (2014)

Thomas DiMera

Tony DiMera 
Thaao Penghlis (1981–85, 2007–09, 2019–)

Monty Dolan
Jay Robinson (1988–89)

Andrew Donovan IV
Robert Eliot Canko (1986–88)
Brandon Amber (1988–89)
Justin Page (1989)
Sky Rumph (1989–90)
Bradley Michael Pierce (1990–91)
Brian Davila (1991–92)
Unknown (1996–97)

Drew Donovan
Charles Shaughnessy (1988, 2017)

Emma Donovan
Jane Windsor (1985–86)

Eve Donovan
Charlotte Ross (1987–91)
Kassie DePaiva (2014–20)

Shane Donovan
Charles Shaughnessy (1984–92, 2002, 2010, 2012–13, 2016–17)
Joseph Mascolo (2017)

Theresa Donovan (born Jeannie Donovan)
Hannah Taylor Simmons (1990–91)
Alicia and Emily Pillatzke (1991–92)
Caitlin Wachs (1992)
Gabriella Massari (1992)
Unknown (1996–97)
Jen Lilley (2013–16, 2018)

Arthur Downey
John Calvin (1989–90)

Rebecca Downey
Tracy Kolis (1989–90)

Lee DuMonde
Brenda Benet (1979–82)

Renée DuMonde (deceased)
Philece Sampler (1981–84)

Yvette DuPres
Lori Hallier (1989–90)

Rose Duncan
Gwen McGee (2014–18)
Judge.

Chanel Dupree
Precious Way (2021)
Raven Bowens (2021–)

George Durant
Larry Sullivan (2013)

E
Earl
Christian Payne (1998)
Chris Eckles (2004)
Ricky Dean Logan (2008)

Ed
Steve Nave (1983–88)

Eddie
Geoff Koch (1998)
Brett Zimmerman (2012–14)

Eli
Garrett Clayton (2010)
Joshua Snyder (2012)

Eliana
Anna Werner (1996–2003)

Emerson
Jeff Snyder (2003)

Evan
Mason Davis (2013)

Lachlan Ebersole
Juan Carlos Salazar (1998)

Walter Edison
John Graham (1965–66)

Pete Edwards
Tony Winters (2011, 2014, 2016)

Rhea Edwards
Allyn Ann McLerie (1973)

Gregory Eldridge
Jack De Mave (1993)
Doctor.

Irene Ellis
Laura Stone (2009)

Janet Elman
Anita Finlay (2008)
Doctor.

Lindy Elroy
Jessica Barth (2007)

Britta Englund
Amy Stock-Poynton (1986)

Lars Englund
Kenneth Jezek (1986–87)

Jennifer Evans
Susan Angelo (2014)

Frank Evans
Ford Rainey (1977–78)
Frank Schofield (1979–80)

Kyle Evans
Kevin Cater (1995)

Marlena Evans
Deidre Hall (1976–87; 1991–2009; 2011–present)

Martha Evans
Diana Douglas (1977–79; 1982)

Samantha Evans (deceased)
Marlena's twin sister, was murdered by the Salem Strangler. Namesake of Marlena's daughter Sami Brady.  
Andrea Hall (1977–80, 1982)
Deidre Hall (1992, 2008)

Todd Evans (deceased) 
Brian Forrest (1985)

Trista Evans (deceased)
Barbara Crampton (1983–84)

F
Flynn
Steve Bean (2013)

Francisco
Dave Baez (2011)

Frank
Lewis Dauber (1993)

Jessica Blake Fallon
Jean Bruce Scott (1980–82; 2012)

Joshua Fallon
Stephen Brooks (1980–81)
Scott Palmer (1981–82)

Nick Fallon (deceased)
Blake Berris (2006–09, 2012–14, 2021, 2023)
Stacey Haiduk (2023)
Judi Evans (2023)
Chrishell Stause (2023)

Lili Faversham
Millicent Martin (1998–2001)

Nancy Fedelhorn
Cathy Lind Hayes (2003)

Sidney Fell
Hal Hamilton (1965)
Doctor

Frank Ferguson
Alan Dexter (1965–66)

Brandee Fields
Monet Mazur (1993)
Elaine Hendrix (1994)

Jim Finch
Michael Winters (2006)
Doctor

Arnold Finegan
Galen Gering (2011)

Roger Fisher
John Enos III (2017–present)

Jim Fisk
Robert J. Stevenson (1965)
Burt Douglas (1965–66)

Karen Fitzpatrick
Marsha Clark (2003–10)
Judge.

Joe Foley
S.A. Griffin (2007)

Carlo Forenza
Don Diamont (1984–85)

Gillian Forrester
Camilla More (1986–87)

Grace Forrester
Carey More (1987)
Camilla More (1987–88)

Stephanie Laff
Wendy Fox (2004)

Christian Franke
Andreas Beckett (2004)

Liam Frasier (deceased)
Mark Collier (2013–14)

Debra Frazier
Alicia Leigh Willis (2014)

Brett Fredericks
Richard Bergman (1983)

Roz Fuller
Hope Alexander-Willis (1989)

G
Gabby
Joy Bisco (2007)

Galen
Tom Lind (2014)

George
Yuval David (2008–10)

Gladys
Frances Fisher (2011)

Granger
Joel Swetow (2007)
Doctor.

Guillermo
Kurt Caceres (2016)

Glenn Gallagher
Rob Estes (1986–87)

Norman Galluzzo
Julian Gamble (1987)

Crystal Galore
Sarah G. Buxton (2004)

Miguel Garcia
Philip Anthony-Rodriguez (2018)

Lisanne Gardner (deceased)
Lynn Herring (1992)

David Goldberg
George Wyner (2003, 2010–11, 2013)
Judge.

Danny Grant
Roger Aaron Brown (1981–86)

Eli Grant
Lamon Archey (2017–present)

Helen Grant
Ketty Lester (1975–77)

Paul Grant (deceased)
Lawrence Cook (1975–76)

Valerie Grant
Tina Andrews (1975–77)
Rose Fonseca (1977–78)  
Diane Sommerfield (1981–82)
Vanessa A. Williams (2016–present)

Robin Green
Edrickcan LaQuan (2006)

Ian Griffith
Harrison Douglas (1985)
Darby Hinton (1985–86)

Mimi Grosset
Gail Johnson (1979–80)

Harry Grunwell
Carlos Del Valle (1999)

H
Harold
Julian Barnes (2009–18)

Henderson
Ron Leath (1987–2004, 2008–17)

Hillary
Jennifer Landon (2017)

Dan Hall
Robert Parks-Valletta (2007)

Brooke Hamilton
Adrienne La Russa (1975–77)
Eileen Barnett (1978–80)

Cordy Han
Jamie Chung (2007)
Christina Ahn (2007–08)

Lacey Hansen
Erin Chambers (2004–08)

Alan Harris
Paul Kersey (1993–95)

Dean Hartman
Nick Stabile (2009)

Kevin Hathaway
Pat Sajak (1983)

Maxwell Hathaway
Tom Hallick (1984)

Megan Hathaway
 Miranda Wilson (1984–85, 2023)

Benjy Hawk (deceased)
Darrell Thomas Utley (1988–90)
Jim Lunsford (2006–07)

Ellen Hawk (deceased)

Orion Hawk 
Sandy McPeak (1988–89)

Howard "Hawk" Hawkins
J. Eddie Peck (1991–92)

Adriana Hernandez
Alma Delfina (2016)

Arianna Hernandez (deceased)
Felisha Terrell (2009)
Lindsay Hartley (2009–10)

Dario Hernandez
Francisco San Martin (2011)
Jordi Vilasuso (2016–17)

Eduardo Hernandez
A Martinez (2015–17, 2020)

 Gabi Hernandez
Gabriela Rodriguez (2009–10)
Camila Banus (2010–)

Rafe Hernandez
Galen Gering (2008–)

Cole Hines
Riley Bodenstab (2013–15)

Howie Hoffstedder
Stanley Brock (1983–86)

Morgan Hollingsworth
Kristen Renton (2007–08)

Kate Honeycutt
Elinor Donahue (1984–86)

Simon Hopkins
Robert Rockwell (1987)
Doctor

Addie Horton (deceased)
Patricia Huston (1965–66)
Patricia Barry (1971–74)

Alice Horton (deceased)
Frances Reid (1965–2007)

Allie Horton
Elle and Ithaca Kremer (2007–08)
Charlotte and Stella Penfield (2008)
Anna and Ella Gietzen (2009)
Campbell and Carolyn Rose (2009–14)
Lindsay Arnold (2020–23)
Raven Bowens (2022)

Arianna Horton 
Harper and Sydnee Udell (2013–19)
Kingston Foster (2019)
Sydney Brower (2019–20)

Bill Horton (deceased)
Paul Carr (1965–66)
Edward Mallory (1966–80, 1991–93)
Christopher Stone (1987–88, 1994)
John H. Martin (2010)

Jennifer Horton
Maren Stephenson (1976–77)
Jennifer Peterson (1977–79)
Melissa Reeves (1985–95, 2000–06, 2010–22)
Stephanie Cameron (1995–98) 
Cady McClain (2020–)
Marci Miller (2021)

Jeremy Horton
Jeremy Allen (1989)
Jeffrey Clark (1989)
Trevor Donovan (2007)

Kitty Horton
Wife of Tommy Horton, mother of Sandy Horton. 
Regina Gleason (1967–69)

Laura Horton (deceased)
Floy Dean (1966)
Susan Flannery (1966–75)
Susan Oliver (1975–76)
Rosemary Forsyth (1976–80)
Jaime Lyn Bauer (1993–99, 2003, 2010, 2013, 2016, 2018, 2021)
Cady McClain (2021)

Lucas Horton
Bryan Dattilo (1993–2010, 2012–)

Maggie Horton Kiriakis
Suzanne Rogers (1973–)

Marie Horton
Maree Cheatham (1965–68, 1970–71, 1973, 1994, 1996, 2010)
Kate Woodville (1977)
Lanna Saunders (1979–85)

Melissa Horton
Joseph Trent Everett (1971)
Matthew Bowman (1971)
Kim Durso (1976)
Debbie Lytton (1978–80, 1982)
Lisa Trusel (1982–88, 1994, 1996, 2002, 2010)
Camilla Scott (1990–91)

Mickey Horton (deceased)
John Clarke (1965–2004)
Richard Voight (2004)
John Ingle (2004–06)
Kevin Dobson (2008)

Mike Horton
Son of Bill Horton and Laura Horton, brother of Jennifer Horton, half-brother of Lucas Horton, grew up believing Bill's brother Mickey was his biological father. Became a doctor.  
Kyle Puerner (1968–69)
Wade Holdsworth (1969)
Brian Andrews (1970)
Bobby Eilbacher (1970)
Eddie Rayden (1970)
Alan Decker (1970–71)
John Amour (1971–73)
Dick DeCoit (1973)
Stuart Lee (1973)
Wesley Eure (1974–81)
Paul Coufos (1981–82)
Michael T. Weiss (1985–90)
Roark Critchlow (1994–99, 2010, 2022)

Nathan Horton
Mark Hapka (2009–11)

Sandy Horton
Daughter of Tommy Horton and Kitty Horton, became a doctor. 
Astrid Warner (1967)
Heather North (1967–72)
Martha Smith (1982)
Pamela Roylance (1983–84)

Sarah Horton
Colin Lewis (1981)
Anthony Seaward (1981–82)
Katie Krell (1982–83)
Lisa Brinegar (1985–89)
Shana Lane-Block (1989)
Aimee Brooks (1990–91)
Allison Brown (1991)
Linsey Godfrey (2018–)

Tom Horton (deceased)
Macdonald Carey (1965–94)

Tommy Horton
John Lupton (1967–73, 1975–80)

Will Horton
Shawm and Taylor Carpenter (1995–2002)
Darian Weiss (2002–03)
Christopher Gerse (2003–08)
Dylan Patton (2009–10)
Chandler Massey (2010–14, 2017–)
Guy Wilson (2014–15)

Amanda Howard Peters
Mary Frann (1974–79)

Meredith Hudson
Rachel Kimsey (2009)

Quinn Hudson
Bren Foster (2011–12)

Diane Hunter
Mother of Susan Hunter. 
Jane Kean (1965–66)
Coleen Gray (1967–68)

Marcus Hunter (deceased)
Doctor.
Richard Biggs (1987–94)

Richard Hunter
Father of Susan Hunter. 
Terry O'Sullivan (1966–68)

I
Ian
Tyler Blackburn (2010)

Ilana
Mikaila Baumel (2007)

Imelda
Gwen Van Dam (1986)

Inez
Terri Lyn Rodriguez (1998)

Iris
Deborah May (2002)

Ivan
Michael Houston King (2001)

Tillie Inman
Ruta Lee (2012)

Hans Involt
Henry Stolow (1987)

J
J.J.
Bradford Dillman (1973)

Jacobson
Christopher Forsyth (2012)

Jasmine
Jolina Collins (1984–85)

Jeremiah
Greg Jackson (2014–15)

Jimmy 
Michael Dorn (1986–87)

Joey
Merritt Yohnka (1984–90)

Jorge
Jorge Diaz (2015)

Robin Jacobs
Derya Ruggles (1985–87, 1989)

Leslie James
Dianne Harper (1980–81)

Madison James (deceased)
Sarah Joy Brown (2011–12)

Timothy Jansen
Priest.
Michael O'Neil (1996)
Jim Beaver (1996–97, 2000, 2002–03)
James Lancaster (2003–06, 2008)

Ivy Jannings
Holly Gagnier (1985–87)

Pete Jannings
Michael Leon (1983–86)

Tess Jannings
Melonie Mazman (1984)

Maxwell Jarvis
Charles Bateman (1980–81)

Randall Jaynes
Andrew Lamond (2006)
Doctor.

Grace Jeffries
Sandra Canning (1990)

Aiden Jennings
Daniel Cosgrove (2014–16)

Chase Jennings
Connor Kalopsis (2014–15)
Hyrum Hansen (2014; temporary replacement)
Jonathon McClendon (2015–16)

Colonel Alfred Jericho
Steve Eastin (1989–90)

Adrienne Johnson
Denise Wanner (1986)
Judi Evans (1986–91, 2007–08, 2010–20)
Alison Sweeney (1987; flashbacks)

Duke Johnson (deceased)
James Luisi (1987, 1990–92)

Earl Johnson
James Luisi (1989)

Jo Johnson
Joy Garrett (1987–93)
Marilyn McIntyre (1993, 2002–03, 2005–06)

Joey Johnson
Brody and Jonas (2008–09)
Jadon Wells (2012–14)
James Lastovic (2015–17, 2020)

Stephanie Johnson
Amanda and Jessica Gunnarson (1990–92)
Shayna Rose (2006–07)
Shelley Hennig (2007–11, 2017)
Abigail Klein (2022–)

Steve Johnson
Stephen Nichols (1985–90, 2006–09, 2015–)
Aaron Nichols (1987)

Daniel Jonas (deceased)
Shawn Christian (2008–17, 2020)

Holly Jonas
Cara and Sienna Gwartz (2016–17)
Oakley and Taytum Fisher (2017)
Harlow and Scarlett Mallory (2018–20)
Elin Alexander (2020-present)

Melanie Jonas
Molly Burnett (2008–12, 2014–16)

Parker Jonas
Ellie and Rose Karchmer (2010–11)
Bailey and Rowan McAlevey (2010; temporary replacement)
Rheya and Thea Readmond (2010; temporary replacement)
Anton and Preston LeBlanc (2011)
Evan and Luke Kruntchev (2013–15)
Christian Ganiere (2016–2017)

Kim Jones
Michele Healey Lasher (1988–2003)
Nurse.

Steven "Jonesy" Jones (deceased)
Robert Mandan (1997–98)

K
Kinsey
Shelby Young (2009–11)

Kostas
Jeff Bosley (2016)

Mitch Kauffman
Philip Levien (1986–87)

Franco Kelly (deceased)
Victor Alfieri (1996–98)

Ed Kemp
Jon Van Ness (1985)

Martine Kent
Ciera Payton (2012)
Police officer.

Owen Kent
Wes Ramsey (2009)

Penelope Kent 
Eileen Davidson (1998)

Walter Kent
Gordon Thomson (2009)

J.L. King
Matt Battaglia (1997)

Woody King
Lane Caudell (1982–83)

Alex Kiriakis
Jonathan Thornton (1989–91)
Robert Scott Wilson (2022–)

Deimos Kiriakis
Vincent Irizarry (2016–17, 2021)

Joey Kiriakis
Loren Mead (1990-91)
Benjamin Iorio (1990-91)

Justin Kiriakis
Wally Kurth (1987–91, 2009–)

Philip Kiriakis
Brandon Tyler (1999)
Jay Kenneth Johnson (1999–2002, 2007–11, 2020–21)
Kyle Brandt (2003–06)
John-Paul Lavoisier (2015–16)

Sonny Kiriakis
Freddie Smith (2011–20)
Zach Tinker (2022–)

Tyler Kiriakis

Victor Kiriakis
John Aniston (1985–2022)

Victor Kiriakis II
Candace Mead (1990)
Jacob Iorio (1990)
Kurt Wetherill (2001)

Xander Kiriakis
Paul Telfer (2015–)

Chris Kositchek
Josh Taylor (1977–87)

Jake Kositchek
Jack Coleman (1981–82)

Ella Kraft
Vernee Watson-Johnson (2007)

Thomas Edward "Tek" Kramer
Rhasaan Orange (2003–07)

Amber Kress
Erika Page White (2008)
Doctor.

L
Lamar
Erik Audé (2010)

Leo
Eric Kan (2001–02)
Ed Marinaro (2011)

Liam
Morgan Brown (2007)

Lisa
Lisa Williams (1992–2004, 2006–07)

Luke
Stephen Anthony Henry (1986–88)

Gregory Lacost
Clayton Landey (1990–92)

Chip Lakin
Jay Pickett (1991–92)

Jake Lambert 
Brandon Barash (2020–23)

Kevin Lambert
Brett Lawrence (2001)
Robert Benvenisti (2002–07)

Maxine Landis
Aloma Wright (2008–15)

Leslie Landman
Pamela Bowen (1987)

Chloe Lane
Nadia Bjorlin (1999–2005, 2007–11, 2013, 2015–)

Walter Larkin
John Bannon (1967)

Paige Larson (deceased)
True O'Brien (2014–15, 2017, 2020)

Ted Laurent
Gilles Marini (2018–19)

Maya Leano
Vivian Guzman (2003)

Aaron Lee
Brandon DeShazer (2009–10)

China Lee
Gillian White (2007)

Robert LeClair
Robert Clary (1972–73, 1975–83, 1986)

Douglas LeClair (1976)

Pete LeGrand
John Gabriel (2002)

Don Lerner
Jim Pacitti (2013–14)

Rusty Lincoln
Francis De Sales (1965–66)

Yo Ling
Tobin Bell (2016)

Gretchen Lindquist
Bonnie Burroughs (1991)

Dean Randall Lochlan
Robert Clotworthy (2007–08)

Bonnie Lockhart
Robin Riker (2000)
Kathy Connell (2000–02)
Judi Evans (2003–07, 2017–18, 2020–)

Conner Lockhart
Austin Wolff (1999–2007)
Noah Segan (2007)

David Lockhart
Ian Patrick Williams (2007)

Mimi Lockhart
Doren Fein (1999)
Farah Fath (1999–2007, 2018)

Patrick Lockhart
Brody Hutzler (2004–07)

Jesse Lombard
Tony Rhodes (1992)

Roger Lombard
Mark Drexler (1992)

Stella Lombard
Elaine Bromka (1992)

Reginald Lumberg
Kyle T. Heffner (2008)

M
Christian Maddox
Unknown actor (1987)
Brock Kelly (2019–21)

Manuela
Tara Platt (2006)

Marie
Harris Kendall (1993–2003)

Marty
Marty Davich (1977–93)

Mary
Mary Garripoli (2008)

Mateo
Andoni Gracia (2016, 2018)

Max
Hal Riddle (1971–75)

Max II
Reed Rudy (1996–98)

Milos
Andy Demetrio (2017)

Myron
Craig Welzbacher (2016–17)

Matt MacKenzie
Barry Jenner (1985)

Miles Malloy
Jerry Penacoli (2000, 2013–14)

Travis Malloy
Braden Matthews (1997)

Carly Manning
Crystal Chappell (1990–93, 2009–11)

Ivan Marais
Ivan G'Vera (1991–2000, 2011, 2020–21)

Alex Marshall
Quinn Redeker (1979–87)

David Martin
Steven Mines (1966)
Clive Clerk (1966–67)

Helen Martin
K. T. Stevens (1966–67, 1969)

John Martin
Ed Prentiss (1966)
John Brubaker (1966–71)

Oliver Martin
Shawn Stevens (1982–83)

Susan Hunter Martin
A classmate of Julie Olson, mother of Dickie Martin (with David), and Annie Peters (with Greg) shot and killed her first husband David Martin, blaming him for Dickie's death after he fell off a swing set. Married Greg Peters in 1973.
Denise Alexander (1966–73)
Bennye Gatteys (1973–76)

Serena Mason (deceased)
Melissa Archer (2014–15, 2017)

Ian McAllister
Ian Buchanan (2012)

Taylor McCall
J. Cynthia Brooks (1992–93)

Mia McCormick
Taylor Spreitler (2009–10)

Kyle McCullough
Richard Hill (1980)

Rob McCullough
Jay Bontatibus (2008)

Ali McIntyre
Lisa Linde (1998–99)

Claire McIntyre
Marla Adams (1999)

Paul Mendez
Eddie Velez (2001–03)

Craig Merritt
Father of Tony Merritt, an airline pilot. Briefly married to his son's former fiancé  Marie Horton when Tony had disappeared due to a rare blood disease, not wanting Marie to watch him suffer and die. After Tony returned to Salem, Craig stepped aside to let Marie and Tony have a second chance at love.
David McLean (1965–67)
Harry Lauter (1966; temporary replacement)

Tony Merritt
Son of Craig Merritt and fiancé of Marie Horton. Tony suffered from a blood disease and decided to leave the night of their wedding not wanting Marie to watch him suffer and die. Tony returned to Salem, and Craig stepped aside to let Marie and Tony have a second chance at love. Sadly, the trust between Tony, Marie, and the Hortons was gone, so he and Marie ended their relationship and he left Salem later that year.      
Richard A. Colla (1965–66)
Don Briscoe (1966)
Ron Husmann (1966–67)

Hal Michaels
Real Andrews (2016–17)

Harris Michaels
Steve Burton (1988)

Jade Michaels
Paige Searcy (2016–17)
Gabrielle Haugh (2017)

Lee Michaels
Robin Mattson (2010–11)

Logan "Parrot Man" Michaels
Barry Cutler (1995–96)

Anne Milbauer
Meredith Scott Lynn (2012–17)

Crystal Miller
Ashlee Holland (2008)

Angela Moroni
Ayda Field (2000–01)

Vincent Moroni
Carl Weintraub (2000–02)

Rebecca Morrison
Dani Minnick (1993)

Colin Murphy (deceased)
Robert Cuthill (2001)
Justin Melvey (2001–04)

Tim Myers
Roy Jackson (2009–11)

N
Navidad
Rayna Tharani (2015)

Nick
Mick Regan (1986)

Nico
Lorenzo Caccialanza (1988–91, 1999–2000, 2002–03, 2005–06)
Scott James (1989–90)

Nobu
Clyde Kusatsu (2003)

Paul Narita
Christopher Sean (2014–18)

Tori Narita
Hiro Ambrosino (2015)

Hillary Nelson
Jennifer Landon (2017)

Jeanine Nelson
Shay Brown (2003)

Scooter Nelson
Robb Derringer (2017)

Gavin Neuwirth
Daniel Pilon (1992)

Liv Norman
Sydney Penny (2011)
Doctor.

Alex North (deceased)
Wayne Northrop (2005–06)

Rebecca North
Brooke Bundy (1975–77)

Tracy North
Hettie Lynne Hurtes (1979)

Robert Novack
Don Matheson (1987)

O
Olga
Istelle Petra (2005)

Ollie
Kiyano La'vin (2009)

Omar
Erick Avari (2009)

Orin
Daryl Brown (1999)
Reverend.

Orpheus (real name Milo Harp)
George DelHoyo (1986–87, 2016, 2020–)

Oscar
David J. Partington (1993)

Owen
Jaden Betts (2014)

Ozzie
Vasili Bogazianos (1993)

Big Chauncey O'Hanrahan
M. C. Gainey (2002)

Dom Ohanion
Jeffrey Vincent Parise (2007)
Police detective

Ben Olson (deceased)
Husband of Addie Horton, president of the First National Bank of Salem. Father of Julie Olson and Ben Olson. Moved to Paris with his wife and son.  In 1971, Ben died offscreen from a heart attack, which prompts Addie to return to Salem. 
Robert Knapp (1965)

Julie Olson
Charla Doherty (1965–66)
Catherine Dunn (1967)
Catherine Ferrar (1967–68)
Susan Seaforth Hayes (1968–84, 1990–94, 1996, 1999–)

Steven Olson
Flip Mark (1965–66)
James Carroll Jordan (1972)
Stephen Schnetzer (1978–79)

Gabriella 'Gabby' Ortiz
Gina La Piana (2009)

Wanda Owen
Toni Lawrence (1983)

P
Patty
Jacee Jule (1997–2004)

Paul
Arthur Senzy (1996)
Michael Guarnera (2004)

Phelps
Jackson Davis (2011)

Rick Paige
Dean Howell (1984)

Carson Palmer
Jack Armstrong (1999–2003)
District attorney

Diane Parker
Dana Kimmell (1983–84)
Cindy Fisher (1984)
DeAnna Robbins (1984–85)

Eileen Parker
Misty Carlisle (2003)
Lindsay Frame (2005)

Gabrielle Pascal
Karen Moncrieff (1987–88)

Frank Paton 
Thomas F. Duffy (1997)

Linda Patterson
Nadyne Turney (1970)
Margaret Mason (1970–71, 1975–80, 1982)
Elaine Princi (1984–85)

Lavinia "Peachy" Peach
Diana Webster (1985–86)
Pamela Kosh (1986–87, 1991–92)

Hugh Pearson
Hugh McPhillips (1979)

Nancy Pearson 
Sonia Curtis (1985–92)

Ellis Pendleton
Jonathan Erickson Eisley (2011)

Celeste Perrault
Tanya Boyd (1994–2007)
Beverly Todd (2012)

Friar Peter
Richard McGonagle (2000)

Anne Peters
Jeanne Bates (1972–75)

Eric Peters
John Lombardo (1971)
Stanley Kamel (1972–76)

Greg Peters
Peter Brown (1972–79)

Phil Peters
Herbert Nelson (1972–75)

Ilya Petrov
Kai Wulff (1983–91)
Mark Laursen (2016)

Jim Philips
Ex-husband of Linda Patterson, father of Melissa Horton.
Victor Holchak (1971, 1973-76) 

Russell Pike
Andrew Caple-Shaw (2004)
Lieutenant Commander.

Lani Price
Sal Stowers (2015–22)

Tamara Price
Marilyn McCoo (1986–87, 2019–20)

Jerry Pulanski
Jason Culp (1989)

Q
Quinn
Rich Amend (1992)

Queenie
Gloria LeRoy (1989)

Evelyn Quarry	
Laura Niemi (2007)

R
Raines
Aaron D. Spears (2016–17)
Lieutenant.

Taylor Raines
Katherine Ellis (1998–99)

April Ramirez
Lisa Howard (1988–91)

Emilio Ramirez
Billy Hufsey (1988–91)

Julio Ramirez
Michael Bays (1988–89)

Vin Ramsell
Todd Babcock (2003)

Kai Rawlings
Andy Mackenzie (2007)

Darrell Ray
Jose Yenque (1998–99)

Benjamin Reardon
Rachel Hall (1993)
Anthony Smith (1993)
Shaquille Toney (1993–94)
Ashanesse and Nasharin Holderness (1994–95)

Wendy Reardon
Lark Voorhies (1993–94)
Tammy Townsend (1994–96)
Yvonna Kopacz (1996–97)

Austin Reed
Patrick Muldoon (1992–95; 2011–12)
Austin Peck (1995–2002; 2005–06; 2017)
Tommy McDonough (1994; flashbacks)

Billie Reed
Lisa Rinna (1992–95; 2002–03; 2012–13; 2018)
Courtney and Erica Chasen (1994; flashbacks)
Heather Lauren Olson (1994; flashbacks)
Krista Allen (1996–99)
Julie Pinson (2004–08)

Curtis Reed
Nick Benedict (1993–95, 1997, 1999–2001)

Eddie Reed
Robert Parucha (1988–89)
Deke Anderson (1989)

Olivia Reed
Amy Yasbeck (1986–87)

Barb Reiber
Tamara Clatterbuck (2001–02)

Glen Reiber
Paul Logan (2001–02, 2005)

J.T. Reiber
Brandon and Dylan Fischer (2000)
Jacob and Joshua Rips (2000–02, 2005)

Eric Richards
John Aniston (1970)

Janey Richards
Candi Milo (1985)

Jordan Ridgeway
Chrishell Stause (2013–15, 2019–21, 2023)

Gwen Rizczech
Emily O'Brien (2020–present)
Linsey Godfrey (2022)

Tiffany Rizczech
Emily O'Brien (2021)

Trent Robbins (deceased)
Charles Van Eman (1987)
Roscoe Born (2008)

Kate Roberts
Elaine Princi (1977–79)
Deborah Adair (1993–95)
Lauren Koslow (1996–present)

Sasha Roberts
Julie Jeter (1986)
Danielle Brisebois (1987)
Michelle Nicastro (1987)
Yvette Nipar (1987)

Wilhelm Rolf
William Utay (1997–2003, 2007–08, 2017–21)
Richard Wharton (2022–)

Tim Rollins
Brian Heidik (1992–93)

Percy Ruggles
Ian Patrick Williams (2013)

Marjorie Rutherford
Muriel Minot (1985)

Dan Ryan
David Rupprecht (1990–92)

S
Sarah
Kristi McDaniel (1995–96)

Satan
Deidre Hall (1994–95, 2004, 2021)
Eileen Davidson (1995, 2021)
Staci Greason (1995)
Drake Hogestyn (1995, 2021)
Bill Hayes (2021)
Stacy Haiduk (2021, 2023)
Stephen Nichols (2021)
Carson Boatman (2021–22)
Dan Feuerriegel (2022)
Brandon Barash (2022) 
Martha Madison (2022) 
Lindsay Arnold (2022)
Raven Bowen (2022)
Lucas Adams (2022)

Scott
Kwesi Boakye (2005)

Sheila
Tionne Watkins (2016–20)

Sheldon 
Dan Woren (1987–90)

Sophie
Sung Hi Lee (2005)

Sullivan
Jeffrey Vincent Parise (2007–08)

Domingo Salazar
Geno Silva (1991)

Bob Salke
D. C. Douglas (2014)

Kurt Schwengel
Matthew Mahaney (1999–2000)

Brian Scofield
Robert Mailhouse (1991–92)

Cassie Scofield
Melissa Baum (1990–91)

Tanner Scofield
Michael Easton (1991–92)

Vern Scofield
Wayne Heffley (1988–93, 2002–03, 2006)

Adam Scott
Randy Reinholz (1989)

Daniel Scott
Stan Ivar (1994–96)

Ivy Selejko
Holly Gagnier (1985–87)

Marvin "Speed" Selejko
Robert Romanus (1983–85)
Tom Everett (1985)

Henry Shah
Andre Khabbazi (2017–18)
Piter Marek (2019)

Jane Smith
Stacy Haiduk (2010)
Gina Gallego (2010-11)

Kyle Southern
Michael Cardelle (2015)

Jan Spears
Natalie Ramsey (1999)
Heather Lauren Olson (1999–2004)
Heather Lindell (2004–05, 2020–)

Agent Spencer
Greg Ellis (2012)

Jude St. Clair
Jeff Griggs (1995–96)

Leo Stark
Greg Rikaart (2018–20)

Willow Stark (deceased)
Annie Burgstede (2006–07)

Danielle Stevens
Deborah Moore (1992)

Jill Stevens
Lisa Robin Kelly (1996)
Sarah Aldrich (1996–97)

Tad "T" Stevens
Brendan Coughlin (2009–15)

Paul Stewart
Gregory Mortensen (1986)
Robert S. Woods (1986–87)

Derek Sweeney
Brian Cole (1987)

T
Tara
Erica Luttrell (2013)

Tarrington
Ron Barker (1987–92)

Timon 
Brad Lee Wind (2017)

Tobias
William Christopher (2012)

Todd
Jason Ritter (1999)
T.J. Hoban (2015)

Tristan 
Nick Jameson (2001)

Helena Tasso (deceased)
Arianne Zucker (2016)

Larry Tate
John Sterling Carter (2006)

Charlotte Taylor
Sandra Dee Robinson (2008–09)

Faith Taylor
Melinda Clarke (1989–90)

Saul Taylor
James Hampton (1989)

Wendy Taylor
Denice Duff (2015, 2018)

Debra Thomas
Paige Rowland (1997)

Fynn Thompson
Alexander Bruszt (2015–16)

Bree Tjaden
Marie Wilson (2014–15)

Jeremy Torisi
Roger Garcia (1998)
INS Agent.

Ernesto Toscano (deceased)
Terrence Beasor (1989)
Charles Cioffi (1990)
Eric Mason (1990)

Isabella Toscano Black (deceased)
Staci Greason (1989–92, 1995, 2000, 2002–03, 2010)
Abby Bemiller (1990; flashback)
Amber Jones (1990; flashback)

Marina Toscano (deceased)
Hunter Tylo (1989–90)
Bettina Rae (1990; flashbacks)

Summer Townsend
Marie Wilson (2016, 2020)

Melinda Trask
Laura Kai Chen (2013, 2016–19)
Tina Huang (2020–)
District attorney.

Nancy Trent
Beth Chamberlin (1993)

Alyssa Trout
Annalisa Cochrane (2017)

Mason Turner
Bren Foster (2011)

U
Marlo Ungerschtemer
Marcy Kaplan (2000–01)

V
Vargas
Sean Douglas (2013)

Veronica
Spice Williams-Crosby (2004)

Vinny
Paul Savage (1991–92)

Marvin Vale
Tony Craig (1982)

Chico Valez
Robert Madrid (2002)

Hilda Van Beno
Diane Delano (2008–09)

Pamela Van Damme
Martha Hackett (2016–18)

Charlie Van Dieter
Robert Torti (1993)

Giselle Van Hopper
Vanessa Branch (2014)

Claus Van Zandt
Anthony De Longis (1985)

Ogden Vaughn 
Christopher Neame (1986)

Nina Vance
Peggy Lark (1983)

Mason Ventura
Ricardo Molina (2013)

Marco Vignaroli
Filippo Bozotti (2006)

Tony Viola
Charles Howerton (1984)

Angelo Vitali
Angelo Tiffe (2008, 2017, 2021)

Ava Vitali 
Tamara Braun (2008, 2015–16, 2020–22)
Sara Fletcher (2017, voice)

Eddie Vitali
Jeff Chase (2008)

Martino Vitali (deceased)
Joe Penny (2008)

Gina Von Amberg (deceased)
Kristian Alfonso (1999–2001, 2012, 2017–20)

Greta Von Amberg
Jamie Taylor (1998)
Julianne Morris (1998–2002)

Jeff Voorhees
Robert Merrill (2008)

W
Wu
Jack Ong (1993)
Doctor.

Wyatt
Scott Shilstone (2017–18)

Nikki Wade
Renée Jones (1982–83)

Brandon Walker (born Brandon Mendez)
Matt Cedeño (1999–2005)

Fay Walker (deceased)
Valerie Wildman (1999–2003, 2010–11)

Nicole Walker (born Nicole Mendez)
Arianne Zuker (1998–2006, 2008–)

Taylor Walker
Katherine Ellis (1998–99)
Natalia Livingston (2011)
Tamara Braun (2011)

Vanessa Walker
Joyce Little (1988)

Ben Walters
Ty Treadway (2010–11)

Bev Walters
Allison Paige (2013–15)

Larry Welch (deceased)
Andrew Hyatt Masset (1983–85, 2002–03, 2016)

Jason Welles
Aaron Van Wagner (1999–2002, 2007)

Harold Wentworth
Scott Ryan (2001–03)

Oliver Wentworth
Tim Thomerson (2002)

Craig Wesley
Kevin Spirtas (1997–2003, 2005, 2009, 2022–)

Nancy Wesley
Patrika Darbo (1998–2005, 2013, 2016–17, 2022–)

Ben Weston
Justin Gaston (2014)
Robert Scott Wilson (2014–22)

Clyde Weston
James Read (2014–22)

Judge Weston
Tamara Tunie (2011)

Evan Whyland
Lane Davies (1981–82)

Stuart Whyland
Robert Alda (1981–82)

Savannah Wilder
Shannon Tweed (1985–86)

Eugenia Willens
Daphne Bloomer (2002–06)

Doug Williams
Bill Hayes (1970–84, 1986–87, 1993–96, 1999–)

Hank Wilson
Frederic Downs (1973–80)

Kate Winograd
Elaine Princi (1977–79)

Cal Winters
Wortham Krimmer (1989–90)
Joseph Bottoms (1991)

Stephanie Woodruff
Eileen Barnett (1978–80)

Charles Woods
David Leisure (2009–11)
Salem District Attorney. Husband of Madeline Woods.

Madeline Peterson Woods (deceased)
Jessica Tuck (2010)
Judge, attorney and former prostitute/call girl. Wife of Charles Woods.

Malcolm Woods
David Askew (2001–07)

Y
Yang
Stan Abe (2010)
Doctor.

Yuri
Bill Cakmis (1985–86)

Jan Yamamoto
Jennifer Chang (2007)

Ellen Yu
Tamlyn Tomita (2012)
Doctor.

Z
Zest
Ryan March (2005)

See also
 Days of Our Lives characters (1960s)
 Days of Our Lives characters (1970s)
 Days of Our Lives characters (1980s)
 Days of Our Lives characters (1990s)
 Days of Our Lives characters (2000s)
 Days of Our Lives characters (2010s)
 Days of Our Lives cast members
 Previous Days of Our Lives cast members

References 

 
Lists of American drama television series characters